Oscar Peterson Plays "My Fair Lady" is a 1958 album by pianist Oscar Peterson of compositions written by the songwriting duo, Lerner and Loewe. The selections are from the musical My Fair Lady.

Reception

In his Allmusic review Scott Yanow wrote of the reissue "...the pianist and his sidemen uplift those melodies with their usual swinging treatment. Overall the music on this reissue is consistently enjoyable."

Track listing
 "On the Street Where You Live"
 "I Could Have Danced All Night"
 "Show Me"
 "Get Me to the Church on Time"
 "Wouldn't It Be Loverly?"
 "I've Grown Accustomed to Her Face"
 "The Rain in Spain"

Personnel

Performance
Oscar Peterson - piano
Ray Brown - double bass
Gene Gammage - drums

References

1958 albums
Oscar Peterson albums
Albums produced by Norman Granz
Verve Records albums